Bogoštica is a village in Serbia. It is situated in the Krupanj municipality, in the Mačva District of Central Serbia. The village had a Serb ethnic majority and a population of 269 in 2002.

Historical population

1948: 490
1953: 551
1961: 513
1971: 442
1981: 356
1991: 327
2002: 285

Notable individuals
 Lavrentije Trifunović

References

See also
List of places in Serbia

Populated places in Mačva District